The Chaos Communication Camp (also known as CCCamp) is an international meeting of hackers that takes place every four years, organized by the Chaos Computer Club (CCC). So far all CCCamps have been held near Berlin, Germany.

The camp is an event for providing information about technical and societal issues, such as privacy, freedom of information and data security. Hosted speeches are held in big tents and conducted in English as well as German. Each participant may pitch a tent and connect to a fast internet connection and power.

List of Camps

See also 
 Chaos Communication Congress, an annual indoor event, held in December in Germany
 Hack-Tic hacker events, a quadrennial outdoor event, held in August in the Netherlands
 Electromagnetic Field, a bi-annually outdoor event, held in August in England

References

External links

Camp 2019 (recorded talks)
Camp 2015 (recorded talks)
Camp 2011 (recorded talks)
Camp 2007 (recorded talks, video documentation)
Camp 2003 (recorded talks, video documentation)
Camp 1999 (recorded talks, video documentation)

Hacker conventions
Information technology in Germany
Recurring events established in 1999